Khánh Vĩnh is a township and capital of Khánh Vĩnh District, Khánh Hòa Province, Vietnam.

References

Communes of Khánh Hòa province
Populated places in Khánh Hòa province
District capitals in Vietnam
Townships in Vietnam